, later known as , was a Japanese girl group under Hello! Project that debuted in April 1999. They released multiple singles and two albums before disbanding in late 2000.

History 
The group was created under the name Taiyō to Ciscomoon ("Sun and Ciscomoon"), but changed their name to T&C Bomber in March 2000. The group disbanded the same year after a final performance in Osaka, on October 9, 2000.

The band reformed in early 2009, after one of the group's former members posted a blog entry suggesting a reformation for a limited time to celebrate the group's ten-year anniversary, and the release of their new greatest hits album. Their first official reunion was on January 9, 2009, in Shibuya. In March of that year, the group called for fans to sign a petition for a 10th anniversary live performance. In 2 months, the petition received more than 2,200 signatures. Their final live performance took place in October; however, Ruru did not take part in the performance due to scheduling conflicts with her live concerts in Japan. Afterwards, the group's official blog was ended, though it was not taken down and was occasionally updated with information about the members (though has since been removed from the Oricon site).

In 2013, Up-Front Works confirmed that they will reform (minis RuRu)for a concert at Hello! Project's New Year's Eve concert.

In 2015, they reunited again for a concert in Japan again, this time with Ruru for the first time since their disbandment.

Post-T&C Bomber Careers 

Shinoda has since appeared in various sports programmes, and served as a commentator on the women's gymnastics events at the 2004 Athens Olympics.
Atsuko Inaba
After the group split up, the only artist to remain signed with Hello! Project was Atsuko Inaba. She continued performing as a dancer, and appeared in the chorus of various songs over the next nine years; however, her contract with UpFront Agency was terminated in late 2009, after both Inaba and the management decided that her career would go no further with Hello! Project—Inaba also stated that she would "like to see the world from a different angle" after being a performer for so long.

Renamed  within the group by Tsunku, she used this name officially after getting Japanese citizenship. Ruru pursued a singing career in Taiwan. She returned to Japan in 2007 with her debut solo album, .

After leaving Hello! Project, she made her solo indies debut. She then formed a unit, called "Priest", with her younger brother Akihisa.

Discography

Albums

Singles

DVDs

Television

References and notes

External links 
Official Taiyō to Ciscomoon discography page at Up-Front Works Official Website
Taiyō to Ciscomoon/T&C Bomber lyrics at Projecthello.com

Japanese girl groups
Japanese idol groups
Japanese pop music groups
Hello! Project groups
Musical groups from Tokyo